A Gajra is a flower garland that is worn by South Asian women during festive occasions, weddings, or as part of everyday traditional attire. They are made usually of  varies types of jasmine flowers but rose, crossandra and barleria are also widely used in gajras. It can be worn both on the bun and with the braid coiling. Women in India usually wear them with traditional attire. It is also worn on the wrist mainly during festive occasions and weddings.

The gajra is an ornament to decorate a hairstyle and does not generally aid in holding a bun in place. Gajra also refers to a type of pearl workmanship done on jewelry in India.

Gallery

References 

Indian clothing
Hairdressing
Pakistani clothing